George Washington Mooney (February 22, 1896 – February 10, 1985) was a player in the National Football League. He played three seasons with the Milwaukee Badgers.

References

1896 births
1985 deaths
American football running backs
Milwaukee Badgers players
Players of American football from Chicago